The 2006 Iowa Hawkeyes football team represented the University of Iowa during the 2006 NCAA Division I FBS football season. The Hawkeyes played their home games at Kinnick Stadium and were coached by Kirk Ferentz.  After starting the season 5–1, they dropped 6 of 7 games to finish the season with a 6–7 record which included a Big Ten record of 2–6.

Schedule

Roster

Rankings

Game summaries

Montana

at Syracuse

Source: ESPN

Iowa State

In the final in-state match-up of two former Hayden Fry assistant coaches Kirk Ferentz prevailed over Dan McCarney to bring the Cy-Hawk trophy back to Iowa City. A crucial play of the game came in the fourth quarter with Iowa State electing to go for it on fourth down, coming up inches short.

at Illinois

Ohio State

    
    
    
    
    
    
    
    
    

ESPN's College GameDay was in Iowa City for this matchup between the #1 Buckeyes (4-0) and #13 Hawkeyes (4-0). After an Albert Young touchdown early in the 2nd quarter brought the Hawkeyes to within 14-10, Ohio State pulled away for the 21-point win.

Purdue

    
    
    
    
    
    
    
    
    
    
    

The Iowa Hawkeyes welcomed Purdue to Kinnick Stadium one week after losing their much anticipated game against top-ranked Ohio State. Iowa jumped on Purdue early and often, opening up a 14-0 first quarter lead with a touchdown run by Damian Sims and a pass from quarterback Drew Tate to fullback Tom Busch. Kyle Schlicher added two field goals in the second quarter and the Hawkeyes lead 20-3 at halftime. Purdue's only first half scoring came on a 44-yard field goal by freshman Chris Summers. Sims scored again on Iowa's first possession of the second half before Greg Orton caught an 18-yard touchdown pass from Curtis Painter. Tate then hit tight end Scott Chandler for a touchdown and Purdue then responded with a Jaycen Taylor touchdown run. The Boilermakers could get no closer as they were shut out in the fourth quarter. Shonn Greene scored on a short run and Adam Shada returned an interception of a Curtis Painter pass 98 yards for a touchdown.

at Indiana

at Michigan

Northern Illinois

Northwestern

Wisconsin

at Minnesota

Alamo Bowl

Team players in the 2007 NFL Draft

References

Iowa
Iowa Hawkeyes football seasons
Iowa Hawkeyes football